Roger Duane "Zeke" Smith (September 29, 1936 – July 22, 2016) was an American football player in the National Football League (NFL) for the Baltimore Colts and the New York Giants.  He played college football at Auburn University where he was awarded the Outland Trophy in 1958. His banner, along with four other Auburn greats - Bo Jackson, Pat Sullivan, Tracy Rocker and Carlos Rogers, is hanging outside Jordan–Hare Stadium in his honor. He was drafted in the fourth round of the 1959 NFL Draft.

Smith died on July 22, 2016. He was 79 years old at the time of his death.

References

1936 births
2016 deaths
People from Uniontown, Alabama
People from Morgan County, Alabama
Players of American football from Alabama
American football defensive ends
American football offensive guards
Auburn Tigers football players
All-American college football players
Baltimore Colts players
Edmonton Elks players
New York Giants players